Blackmores Limited is an Australian health supplements company founded in the 1930s by naturopath Maurice Blackmore (1906-1977), when Blackmore opened the first health food shop in Australia in Brisbane, Queensland. In August 2020 Blackmores was an ASX 200 company with a market capitalisation of $1.4 billion, but was not listed .  the company employed 843 people. It manufactures an extensive range of vitamin, mineral and herbal supplements, sold in 17 markets across the Asia Pacific region. In 2017, Blackmores was inducted into the Queensland Business Leaders Hall of Fame.

References

External links
  
 Blackmores website
Queensland Business Leaders Hall of Fame - 2017 Inductee digital story - Blackmores

Companies based in Sydney
Companies listed on the Australian Securities Exchange
Nutritional supplement companies of Australia